Alaqagha, Alakaga ( / Alahage) is a town in Kuqa, Aksu Prefecture, Xinjiang, China.


Name
'Alaqagha' / 'Alakaga' is Uyghur for 'flower crow'. According to local understanding, crows/ravens of various colors used to visit the town frequently.

History
In 1958, Alaqagha/Alakaga Commune was established.

In 1984, Alaqagha/Alakaga Commune became Alaqagha/Alakaga Township.

Between 2000 and 2003, Alaqagha/Alakaga Township became Alaqagha/Alakaga Town.

On May 20, 2014, after 4:30 pm, special armed police fired on Uyghur protesters and arrested more than 100. The protesters threatened to storm a government building in Alaqagha/Alakaga. According to a local official, police killed two (including Elqem Memtimin, 23) and injured five. The more than 1,000 Uyghur protesters were demanding the release of 25 Uyghur women and schoolgirls who had been detained for wearing headscarves. The protesters had beat the school principal, Tursun Qadir, and the head of the Alaqagha/Alakaga township government and thrown rocks at local government buildings. A round up of protesters continued into the night. Later that year, a Washington Post team was detained in Alaqagha/Alakaga and ultimately deported from the region. On April 29, 2015, Rebiya Kadeer, then President of the World Uyghur Congress, mentioned the town among areas with credible evidence of state violence that merited further investigation.

Geography
The land is flat with the roads on a north–south orientation. Alaqagha/Alakaga is located near the tripoint of Kuqa, Xayar County and Xinhe County (Toksu).

Administrative divisions
Alaqagha/Alakaga includes twenty-five villages:

Villages (Mandarin Chinese Hanyu Pinyin-derived names except where Uyghur is provided):
Kunasi  (Kunasicun) 
Langan
Bozi
Hongqi, formerly Qiangga (Qianggacun) 
Baghwen (Bagewan;  / )
Wukutuogelake
Tieti'erqi (Tieti'erqicun;) 
Tuohula (Tuohulacun)  
Paizibage (Paizi Bagecun) 
Yangduma (Yangdumacun) 
Yingsa
Kalagaqi'airike (Kalagaqi Airikecun) 
Kuoshi'airike, formerly Kushi'airike
Tianyuan, formerly Kaladong
Zige'erqi (Zige'er Qicun) 
Xiwang, formerly Ketati
Aoyituogelake
Tugemanbaishi (Tugeman Bashicun) , formerly Tugemanbeixi
Bazha, formerly Alahage
Jirimuleke (Jirimu Lekecun;) 
Bisute
Yingqikai'airike (Yingqikai Airikecun) 
Qiaokabositan (Qiaoka Bositancun) , formerly Qiaokapaisitan
Tiereke'airike (Tiereke Airikecun) 
Dönglük (Dunlüke, Dunlukecun;  / ) , formerly Dunluke

Economy
Situated near the intersection of three county-level divisions, the town was traditionally an important market. The local economy is primarily agricultural combined with animal husbandry. Fish are raised in the eastern area including Kunasi. Many fruits are produced including the noted Pyrus nivalis of Qiangga Village, the white peaches of Kunasi Village and the muskmelons of Yingsa Village. The local specialty is smoked plum.

, Qiaokabositan Village was considered deeply economically impoverished.

Demographics

, 99.6% of the population of Alaqagha/Alakaga was Uyghur.

As of 2005–6, 4.65% of the population of Alaqagha/Alakaga (Alahage), in total 1,710 of the residents of the town, were considered to be economically impoverished.

Transportation
 China National Highway 217

References

Populated places in Xinjiang
Township-level divisions of Xinjiang